Eulogius can refer to:

 Saint Eulogius of Alexandria (607 AD)
 Saint Eulogius of Cordova, priest and martyr (859 AD)
 Saint Eulogius, a deacon martyred with Saint Fructuosus
 Eulogius, an early bishop of Amiens
 Eulogius Schneider (1756–1794)
 Eulogius (Georgiyevsky) (1868-1946)